Hiroto (written: , , , , , , , ,  or  in katakana) is a masculine Japanese given name. Notable people with the name include:

, member of the visual kei rock band Alice Nine
, Japanese footballer
Hiroto Hirashima (1910–2007), Japanese-American bowler and activist
, Japanese long-distance runner
, Japanese rock singer
, Japanese boxer
, Japanese footballer
, Japanese footballer
, Japanese footballer
, Japanese footballer
, Japanese actor and voice actor
, Japanese footballer
, Japanese footballer
, Japanese footballer

Fictional characters
, a character from Inazuma Eleven
, a character from Yu-Gi-Oh!
, character from the Assassination Classroom manga and anime series
, a character from the tokusatsu Engine Sentai Go-Onger

See also
Hiroto Station, a railway station in Fukaura, Aomori Prefecture Japan

Japanese masculine given names